Yonn-Dé is an album by David Murray released on the Canadian Justin Time label. Recorded in 2001 and released in 2003 the album features performances by Murray and the Gwo-Ka Masters. It was Murray's first album with the Gwo-Ka Masters and was followed by Gwotet (2005).

Reception
The Allmusic review by David R. Adler awarded the album 4 stars, stating "It is Santi Debriano who proves to be the beating heart of the entire project, lending harmonic shape and direction and making every track a unique journey.".

Track listing
 "TWA Jou San Manjé" - 11:21  
 "Youyou" - 11:02  
 "On Jou Maten" - 10:04  
 "Onomatopée (Boula Djèl)" - 4:47  
 "Nwèl 'O!" - 4:40  
 "Yonn-Dé" - 9:56  
 "La Pli La" - 9:28  
 "Moman Colombo" - 9:01  
All compositions by Guy Konket  
Recorded January 10-February 15, 2001

Personnel
David Murray - tenor saxophone, bass clarinet

Guy Konket - vocal

Klod Kiavue - gwo ka drums, vocals

François Landreseau - gwo ka drums, vocals

Hugh Ragin - trumpet

Craig Harris - trombone

Santi Debriano - bass

Pheeroan AkLaff - drums

References

2002 albums
Justin Time Records albums
David Murray (saxophonist) albums